Ormond Amateur Football Club is an Australian rules football club, located 14 km south east of Melbourne in the suburb of Ormond. 

Ormond is the second-oldest suburban club in the Victorian Amateur Football Association. The club was founded in 1931 by Leslie Edward Smith. In 2008 Ormond welcomed back recently retired AFL player Matthew Robbins as player and assistant coach. After competing in B grade in season 2009, Ormond were narrowly relegated and subsequently moved down to C grade for 2010.

In 2008 the Club won the C Grade premiership, defeating Hampton Rovers 15.12 (102 points) to 9.10 (64 points).

History 
The club was founded in the early years of the Great Depression. A local businessman named Les Smith, believed that the local young people needed a constructive way to channel their energies in difficult times, and that he was able to help them do that through sport. Smith had himself been nurtured as a young player of Australian Rules Football in the Albert Park State School team, which included himself, Roy Cazaly and Frank Beaurepaire. All three had been presented with their uniforms by Henry Harrison, a founding member of the Australian Rules game in the early 1860s.

At the beginning of the 1930s, Smith approached a friend, Councillor Ernie Gunn, to prevail on the local council for a grant of land. Gunn arranged this, and in 1931 the Ormond Amateur Football Club was born. Smith served as president for most of the years between the first playing season, 1932,  and 1959.

Les Smith's daughter, Betty Macgregor, recalls the club's foundation:

Dad was a champion footballer in the bush in his youth. He was dubbed the "Gippsland Flyer". He was training with South Melbourne when World War One broke out. Our family moved back to the city from Maffra at the start of the Depression, and we opened a newsagency on the corner of North Road and Newham Grove in Ormond. It was here that a lot of the planning was done to establish the club.

Of course it was a group effort. The original nucleus of founders included Cec Hattam, Mick Hassett, Peter Dawson and "Doc" Porter. Fred Yewdall was an early player who later went on to serve on the committee, so he was also involved with the club in one way or another from the early years.

I remember Ernie Gunn as a very nice man, and a solid citizen. He was keen to help in any way he could. He made it all possible, by arranging for Council to give us some land. My Dad's regimental colours from World War One - brown and blue - were chosen as the Ormond club colours.

The first function the club had was an afternoon fancy dress party to raise funds. I would have been seven or eight. Everyone met outside the newsagency. Dad came out dressed as a policeman, then they were on their way amid great hilarity - marching down Newham Grove to the ground, where they had a function to celebrate the birth of the club.

Training was on Tuesday and Thursday. On Sunday morning everyone gathered at the ground for a post-mortem of the previous day's game, to assess injuries, and plan for the next week. Everyone came to that - players, groundsmen and committee.

Dad served as president for many years. Mum and Dad threw many parties and gatherings for Ormond players and committee members. Our family's lives revolved around the club for years.

My Uncle Roy Smith - Dad's younger brother - was the club's rep on the Amateur Football Association. He was a leading wine judge, and would bring a flask of sherry to the game. At three-quarter time he would offer players a nip, which some availed themselves of. Mum would pack a hamper for these events, and bring the car to the edge of the oval. We'd watch the game from there. At three-quarter time we'd have afternoon tea.

Dave McNamara, one of the VFL's pre-War greats, came out of retirement to play some games with Ormond. I remember him putting the ball on the ground and doing place kicks. Bob Flegg was Ormond's most brilliant full forward of that time - he was later killed in the War. You would often get a few hundred to a match in those days. If it were a final, it would be a few thousand.

After each home match, those who liked a drink would adjourn to McKinnon's Hotel. The session wouldn't go long, due to six o'clock closing. We'd wait outside with Mum in the car till the pub shut.

We had a picture night at the local cinema sometimes. At one I remember, Clay Crooks was presented with a medal for kicking 19 goals in a match.

My husband, Evan Macgregor, played for Ormond in the early 1950s, and was captain in 1952. When Ormond won the A Grade premiership in 1950, we had a huge party at my parents' home, and then adjourned to various other homes until 3AM or so.

As for my father, he remained deeply involved with the club till his death. It was his passion in life.

At Les Smith's funeral in 1968, so many of the "Ormond family" arrived to pay respects that there was standing room only.

In an article in the club's newsletter, "The Brown & Blue Review" (reprinted in "The Amateur Footballer"), Ormond's long-standing club doctor, JR "Doc" Porter, wrote:

On behalf of the Ormond Amateur Football Club - members, executives and supporters - I present to you a memoir of the grand old man of Ormond, Les Smith... Les Smith was one of nature's ten-footers in the moral and spiritual measure of earthly existence.... His action in starting the ball rolling for the formation of the OAFC was partly coloured by his concern for the youngsters of the district... He was a stickler for the right method or approach and set standards so many of us were pleased to try and maintain...

AFL/VFL players
In all over forty Ormond footballers have played VFL/AFL football and include the following:

Barry Beecroft, South Melbourne
Jack Bray, St Kilda
Peter Brenchley, Melbourne, 1957 premiership
Simon Buckley, Melbourne, Collingwood
Neil Crompton, Melbourne, 1964 premiership
Neville Crowe, Richmond, later president
Simon Eishold, Melbourne
Dick Fenton-Smith, Melbourne, 1957 and 1959 premierships
Ron Irwin (footballer), Melbourne, 1943-47
Ricky Jackson, Melbourne
Dave McNamara, St Kilda (1905–08, 1914–15, 1918–19, 1921–23), played for Ormond from 1924 to 1929.
Laurie Mithen, Melbourne, 1955–57, 1959–60 premierships
Michael Oaten, South Melbourne
Roy Quinn, Richmond, 1943 premiership & North Melbourne
Matthew Robbins, Geelong & Western Bulldogs
Steven Smith, Melbourne
Will Thursfield, Richmond
Brian Walsh, St Kilda
Colin Wilson, Melbourne, 1957 premiership
Max Gawn, Melbourne

References

External links

 Official site

Victorian Amateur Football Association clubs
Australian rules football clubs in Melbourne
1931 establishments in Australia
Australian rules football clubs established in 1931
Sport in the City of Glen Eira